is a Japanese voice actor.

Anime voice roles
 Fantastic Children (2004 TV), Seth 
 D.C.S.S. ~Da Capo Second Season~ (2005 TV), Announcer, Dog (ep 3), Male Student 
 .hack//Roots (2006 TV), PK (eps 20, 22) 
 D.Gray-man (2006 TV), Klack

External links

1971 births
Japanese male voice actors
Living people
Place of birth missing (living people)
People from Mie Prefecture
21st-century Japanese people